Mohammedan Sporting Ground, also known as Mohammedan Sporting–Howrah Union Ground, is a multi-use stadium in Kolkata, India. It is currently used mostly for football matches and is the home stadium of Mohammedan Sporting. The ground has a natural grass turf. Having facilities such as commentary boxes for radio and TV, press box and air conditioned changing rooms, the stadium holds 15,000 people. It is also the home ground of Howrah Union, which it shares with Mohammedan Sporting.

About
The stadium has galleries on three sides and a rampart on the fourth side. The north side gallery is the member's gallery. The east side and south side galleries are still made of a temporary iron structure and are designated for non-member supporters. The playing pitch is about 100 x 60 meters. The club tent and main office are located adjacent to the stadium. The club tent consists of a maintained lawn, with benches.

Upgrade work
In July 2017 second phase upgrade and improvement works started.
 Installing floodlight
 electronic scoreboard
 increase seating capacity from 15,000 to 25,000
 upgrade member gallery with White-Black (club's home colour) bucket chairs
 air conditioned press room
 ultra-modern gymnasium

References

Football venues in West Bengal
Sports venues in Kolkata
1929 establishments in India
Sports venues completed in 1929
20th-century architecture in India